Jean Messiha (born Hossam Boutros Messiha, 10 September 1970) is an Egyptian-born French economist and media personality, formerly a politician and senior civil servant. He was appointed Deputy Undersecretary of Management at the Ministry of Defence in 2014 before he joined the National Front (FN) in 2016, when he became spokesman of Horaces, a group of high-ranking civil servants and business executives who meet once a month to discuss the party platform. Messiha stood as a candidate in the 2017 legislative election in the 4th constituency of the Aisne department.

In 2020, he left the party to assume the presidency of the Apollon Institute, a far-right think tank. In 2022, Messiha joined Éric Zemmour's newly-founded Reconquête party and became its spokesman, although he left the party following the presidential election to return as president of the Apollon Institute.

Early life
Messiha was born Hossam Boutros Messiha in 1970 in Cairo, Egypt, to a family of Coptic Christians; his father was a diplomat. He lived in Bogotá, Colombia from the age of 3 to 7. At the age of 8, he arrived with his family in France, reportedly "not speaking a word of French". He then grew up in Mulhouse. In 1990, upon his naturalisation as a French citizen, he changed his first name to Jean.

Messiha graduated from Sciences Po, where one of his professors was Henri Guaino. He earned a PhD in Economics. His thesis was about the budgetary policies of the Maastricht Treaty and Amsterdam Treaty. He graduated from the École nationale d'administration in 2005.

Career
Messiha began his career as a high-ranking civil servant in 2005. He was appointed as Deputy Undersecretary of Management at the Ministry of Defence in 2014.

Messiha became an advisor to National Rally leader Marine Le Pen in 2014. In May 2016, he became the spokesman of the "Horaces", a group of high-ranking civil servants and business executives, supporting Marine Le Pen, who meet once a month and discuss the political platform of the National Rally. While the group announces more than 155 members, Messiha is the only one whose name has been publicly known so far. According to Dominique Albertini of Libération, Messiha's role within the National Rally is to represent "the drawing power of [the party] towards high-ranking civil servants".

Messiha has asserted his belief in Renaud Camus's Great Replacement conspiracy theory, whereby Christian populations are being "replaced" through non-European immigration, specifically from Muslim and African countries. On social media, he has expressed that Islam is at odds with France's republican system. He is also a critic of the European Union.

A candidate in the 2017 French legislative election to represent Aisne's 4th constituency in the National Assembly, Messiha was defeated in the second round by La République En Marche! candidate Marc Delatte, with 43.73% of valid votes against Delatte's 56.27%.

In November 2020, several news outlets reported that Messiha was going to leave the National Rally. This was later confirmed by Messiha, who announced his departure in an interview published in Valeurs actuelles. In March 2021, Jean Messiha made the headlines in affirming the existence of a "black privilege" during the 46th César Awards. In August 2021, Twitter has permanently suspended his account @jeanmessiha for multiple violations of hateful conduct policy.

In January 2022, Messiha joined Reconquête, the party Éric Zemmour founded in December 2021.

Personal life
Messiha became a naturalised French citizen at the age of 20, changing his first name to "Jean" in the process. He has described himself as a "naturalized ethnic Frenchman" and "Arab outside, French inside". In February 2017, he was surprised to learn that, in spite of his naturalisation, he was still considered an immigrant by the national statistics bureau of France, Institut national de la statistique et des études économiques (INSEE).

References

1970 births
Living people
Egyptian emigrants to France
French people of Coptic descent
Politicians from Mulhouse
French critics of Islam
École nationale d'administration alumni
20th-century French economists
21st-century French economists
French civil servants
National Rally (France) politicians
Reconquête politicians